Sadja is a 1918 German silent film directed by Adolf Gärtner and Erik Lund and starring Eva May and Hans Albers.

Cast
 Hans Albers as Älterer Gelehrter 
 Helene Lanère 
 Eva May as Sadja 
 Heinz Stieda

References

Bibliography
 Hans-Michael Bock and Tim Bergfelder. The Concise Cinegraph: An Encyclopedia of German Cinema. Berghahn Books.

External links

1918 films
Films of the Weimar Republic
German silent feature films
Films directed by Erik Lund
German black-and-white films
1910s German films